The Banjska Monastery is a Serbian Orthodox monastery in the Banjska village near Zvečan, Kosovo.

History
The monastery, along with the Church of St Stephen, was built between 1313 and 1317, founded by Serbian King Stefan Milutin, one of the most powerful rulers of his time and of the Nemanjić dynasty. Milutin built the church as his mausoleum (burial place), and it is where he was first laid to rest. However, following the Battle of Kosovo (1389), his body was moved to Trepča and then in 1460 to Sofia (Bulgaria), where it lies to this day.

The monastery shared the fate of its founder. The monumental building with its church, library, monks' quarters and "imperial palace" began to fall into disrepair very early. At the beginning of the 15th century, a fire destroyed the library and in the second half of the same century, the monastery was probably abandoned. Benedikt Kuprešić, a traveller, mentioned that the monastery was razed to the ground in the 16th century on the orders of the Ottoman Sultan, as Christians who had fled Ottoman tyranny were gathering in it.

St Stephen's, almost totally destroyed, was turned into a mosque in the 19th century and served as such until World War I. The first conservation activity was carried out in 1939 and again in 1990 when the church was partly rebuilt. The monastery is one of the few for which the founding charter has been preserved; it was granted a large estate at its founding, of 75 villages and 8 pastures. As the complex was built as the final resting place of a king, the bishopric was "upgraded" to a stavropegial monastery - roughly translated, an Imperial monastery, fourth by rank in the state (after Studenica, Mileševa and Sopoćani).

The building works were led by Archbishop Danilo II, at that time a bishop, later Serbian Archbishop, who was a close confidant to the king. According to medieval sources, as well as an oral tradition, Banjska was one of the most beautiful Serbian monasteries, built in the Raška architectural style, which was used for all royal mausoleums, from Stefan Nemanja's Studenica monastery to Emperor Dušan's Monastery of the Holy Archangels. The monastery was declared a Monument of Culture of Exceptional Importance in 1990, and is protected by the Republic of Serbia.

See also
List of Serbian Orthodox monasteries

Notes

Further reading
Novaković, S. (1892) Manastir Banjska - zadužbina Kralja Milutina u srpskoj istoriji. Glas Srpske kraljevske akademije, Beograd, 32, 35-41

References

External links 

 Banjska Monastery
 Serbian Orthodox Diocese of Kosovo-Metohija

Cultural Monuments of Exceptional Importance (Serbia)
Nemanjić dynasty endowments
Serbian Orthodox monasteries in Kosovo
Monuments and memorials in Kosovo
Religious organizations established in the 1310s
Persecution of Serbs
14th-century Serbian Orthodox church buildings
District of Mitrovica
Rebuilt buildings and structures
Religious buildings and structures converted into mosques
Medieval Serbian sites in Kosovo
Christian monasteries established in the 14th century
Medieval Serbian Orthodox monasteries